Jhon González (born 29 August 1971) is a Colombian former cyclist. He competed in the men's sprint at the 1992 Summer Olympics.

References

External links
 

1971 births
Living people
Colombian male cyclists
Olympic cyclists of Colombia
Cyclists at the 1992 Summer Olympics
Place of birth missing (living people)
Pan American Games medalists in cycling
Pan American Games bronze medalists for Colombia
Cyclists at the 1991 Pan American Games
Medalists at the 1991 Pan American Games
20th-century Colombian people
21st-century Colombian people